Sensational is the debut studio album by American rapper Yung Gravy. It was released on May 31, 2019, by Republic Records. The album features appearances from a frequent collaborator bbno$, alongside other artists such as Juicy J, Pouya and Lil Baby, among others.

Track listing

Charts

References

2019 debut albums
Republic Records albums
Yung Gravy albums